Bay Bulls may refer to:

 Bay Bulls, Newfoundland and Labrador, the town in Canada
 Bay Bulls (Newfoundland and Labrador), the body of water in Canada